In statistics, the  predicted residual error sum of squares (PRESS) is a form of cross-validation used in regression analysis to provide a summary measure of the fit of a model to a sample of observations that were not themselves used to estimate the model. It is calculated as the sums of squares of the prediction residuals for those observations.

A fitted model having been produced, each observation in turn is removed and the model is refitted using the remaining observations. The out-of-sample predicted value is calculated for the omitted observation in each case, and the PRESS statistic is calculated as the sum of the squares of all the resulting prediction errors:

  

Given this procedure, the PRESS statistic can be calculated for a number of candidate model structures for the same dataset, with the lowest values of PRESS indicating the best structures. Models that are over-parameterised (over-fitted) would tend to give small residuals for observations included in the model-fitting but large residuals for observations that are excluded.
PRESS statistic has been extensively used in Lazy Learning and locally linear learning to speed-up the assessment and the selection of the neighbourhood size.

See also 
 Model selection

References 

Regression diagnostics
Model selection